Shortland Street was the initial commercial street of Auckland and remains a key financial and legal centre for Auckland city. It runs east from Queen Street up to Princes Street, providing a connection from the business district to the Auckland High Court and University of Auckland.

History
Shortland Street, initially called Shortland Crescent, was the initial main street of Auckland, built close to the shoreline of Commercial Bay (since reclaimed), established and metalled by 1844. Fore Street (now Fort Street) was built a block north on the shore of Commercial Bay in 1850. The street was named for Willoughby Shortland, the first Colonial Secretary of New Zealand.

Shortland Street was the earliest commercial hub of Auckland. John Logan Campbell, David Nathan, and other early business figures in Auckland established their first stores on Shortland Street in the 1840s. The street was also ceremonially used as a way to visit Point Britomart (then a military camp), by figures such as Governor William Hobson. In 1858, a major fire broke out on the street, destroying the wooden buildings in the area.

By the 1860s, Queen Street had eclipsed Shortland Street as the primary commercial street for the township, after the land reclamation of Commercial Bay. The street was home to the Auckland Star, one of the major newspapers for Auckland in the late 19th and 20th centuries, as well as the Auckland Club, a gentlemen's club.

Soap opera Shortland Street was named for the street, after it was originally planned to be filmed in a TVNZ-owned studio at 74 Shortland Street.

Demographics

Shortland Street had a population of 1,602 at the 2018 New Zealand census, a decrease of 120 people (−7.0%) since the 2013 census, and an increase of 786 people (96.3%) since the 2006 census. There were 1,071 households, comprising 834 males and 768 females, giving a sex ratio of 1.09 males per female. The median age was 32.1 years (compared with 37.4 years nationally), with 42 people (2.6%) aged under 15 years, 627 (39.1%) aged 15 to 29, 810 (50.6%) aged 30 to 64, and 120 (7.5%) aged 65 or older.

Ethnicities were 50.9% European/Pākehā, 3.7% Māori, 1.9% Pacific peoples, 40.4% Asian, and 8.1% other ethnicities. People may identify with more than one ethnicity.

The percentage of people born overseas was 68.7, compared with 27.1% nationally.

Although some people chose not to answer the census's question about religious affiliation, 57.5% had no religion, 24.3% were Christian, 3.4% were Hindu, 3.4% were Muslim, 3.0% were Buddhist and 2.8% had other religions.

Of those at least 15 years old, 819 (52.5%) people had a bachelor's or higher degree, and 45 (2.9%) people had no formal qualifications. The median income was $43,600, compared with $31,800 nationally. 432 people (27.7%) earned over $70,000 compared to 17.2% nationally. The employment status of those at least 15 was that 966 (61.9%) people were employed full-time, 180 (11.5%) were part-time, and 78 (5.0%) were unemployed.

Notable locations

Blacketts Building, corner of Queen Street and Shortland Street, 1879, South British Insurance building.
South British Insurance Company building, 5–13 Shortland Street, 1920s.
Jean Batten Place Departmental Building, 12 Shortland Street, 1942. Government office/Post Office until 1989.
Hotel DeBrett, 15–19 Shortland Street, 1860 but rebuilt 1920s, called the Commercial Hotel until 1959.
Auckland Star building, 28 Shortland Street, c.1889–1989.
General Buildings, 29–27 Shortland Street, 1928.
Auckland Club, 34 Shortland Street, 1883–2010, gentleman's club.
Vero Centre, 48 Shortland Street, 2000, 38-storey office tower.
Kenneth Myers Centre, 74 Shortland Street, built 1934 as a broadcasting studio for 1YA, and later used by Television New Zealand.
Gus Fisher Gallery, located in the Kenneth Myers Center.
Shortland Flats, 93 Shortland Street, 1924, apartment building.
Churton Memorial, corner of Shortland Street and Emily Place, 1909, memorial to Reverend John Churton, first minister of St Paul's Church.

References

Streets in Auckland
Auckland CBD